List of Railway stations in Botswana include:

Towns served by rail

Existing 

 Ramatlhabama, South Africa - border with South Africa
 Lobatse 
 Gaborone - national capital
 Palapye - junction for coal branch
 Serule - junction
 Francistown 
 Ramokgwebana - border with Zimbabwe
 Palapye - junction
 Morupule - branch terminus
 Serule - junction
 Selibe Phikwe - branch terminus
 Francistown - junction
 Sowa - branch terminus

Proposed

To Namibia 

 Trans-Kalahari Line to Namibia - 2008  1,600 km.
 Aranos - new coal mine
 Palapye - linked to Bulawayo in Zimbabwe
  Francistown 
  Mafeking 
 Lobatse

 Kang in Botswana
 Ghanzi, possible copper-silver mine.
 Morupule Colliery in east central Botswana

  Mariental
  Maltahohe
  Shearwater Bay, Namibia - port
  Aus in Namibia

To Mozambique 

 via South Africa or via Zimbabwe 
 Gaborone to Maputo

  Serule, Botswana via  Zimbabwe to  Maputo (Newport)

To Zambia 

 Botswana - Zambia - Kazungula bridge - 2010

Maps 

 UNHCR Atlas Map

See also 

 Transport in Botswana
 Botswana Railways

References 

 
Railway stations